Rognvald Richard Farrer Herschell, 3rd Baron Herschell (13 September 1923 – 26 October 2008) was a British hereditary peer and politician.

Life
He succeeded his father to the peerage in 1929, and thus enjoyed his peerage for 79 years. He lost his right to sit in the House of Lords upon passage of the House of Lords Act 1999 which disqualified most hereditary peers from an automatic seat.

Herschell was the only son of Richard Herschell, 2nd Baron Herschell, and Vera, daughter of Sir Arthur Nicolson, 10th Baronet, and was educated at Eton College. He was a Page of Honour to the king from 1935 to 1940 and was a train bearer at the coronation of King George VI and Queen Elizabeth in 1937. A captain in the Coldstream Guards, Lord Herschell fought in the Second World War from 1942 to 1945. Despite being entitled to a seat in the House of Lords between 1944 and 1999, he never took his seat.

Family
Lord Herschell married Lady Heather, daughter of Humphry Legge, 8th Earl of Dartmouth, in 1948. They had one daughter, the Hon. Arabella Jane (b. 1955), who is married to Sir John Kiszely. Herschell died in October 2008, aged 85, when the barony became extinct.

Arms

References

Citations

Bibliography
 Bedford, M. (1999). Dod's Parliamentary Companion (118 ed.). Westminster: Vacher Dod Publishing.
 
  http://hansard.millbanksystems.com/people/mr-rognvald-herschell

1923 births
2008 deaths
People educated at Eton College
British people of Polish-Jewish descent
Barons in the Peerage of the United Kingdom
Rognvald

Herschell